Francis Raphael Smith (September 25, 1911 – December 9, 1982) was a Democratic member of the U.S. House of Representatives from Pennsylvania.

Formative years
Born in Philadelphia, all four of Smith's grandparents were Irish immigrants. 

Smith graduated from St. Joseph's College in Philadelphia in 1933, and from the law department of Temple University in Philadelphia in 1938.

Career
Smith was employed as a bank examiner with the Pennsylvania State Banking Department in 1938 and 1939. He unsuccessfully sought election to one of Philadelphia County's allotted at-large seats in the Pennsylvania State House of Representatives in 1938.

Smith was elected as a Democrat to the 77th Congress, but was an unsuccessful candidate for reelection in 1942. 

After his term in Congress, he became a United States Marshal for the eastern district of Pennsylvania, serving from January 29, 1943, until his resignation on April 30, 1945.

He was then appointed collector of internal revenue at Philadelphia on May 1, 1945, and served in that capacity until 1952.

He ran for Register of Wills in Philadelphia in 1953, but was unsuccessful. In 1955, Governor George Leader appointed Smith State Insurance Commissioner.

In December 1963, he was elected to succeed the recently deceased Congressman Bill Green as Chairman of the Philadelphia Democratic Party. He was also an elected member of the Board of Revision of Taxes of Philadelphia and member of Board of View of Philadelphia.

Death and interment
Smith died on December 9, 1982 and was interred at Holy Sepulchre Cemetery in Cheltenham Township, Pennsylvania.

Sources

External links

 

1911 births
1982 deaths
American people of Irish descent
Saint Joseph's University alumni
Temple University Beasley School of Law alumni
United States Marshals
Democratic Party members of the United States House of Representatives from Pennsylvania
Politicians from Philadelphia
20th-century American politicians